Ski jumping at the 1972 Winter Olympics consisted of two events held from 6 to 11 February 1972, with the large hill event taking place at Okurayama Ski Jump Stadium, and the normal hill event at Miyanomori Ski Jump Stadium.

Medal summary

Medal table

Japan topped the medal table by sweeping all three medals in the normal hill event, which were their first ever medals in the sport. In fact, every single country that won a medal in Sapporo was winning their first ever ski jumping medal (East Germans had won medals as part of a unified German team in earlier Games).

Yukio Kasaya, winner of the normal hill event, was the first ever Winter Olympic gold medalist for Japan, while Wojciech Fortuna was the first ever Winter gold medalist for Poland.

Events

Participating NOCs
Sixteen nations participated in ski jumping at the Sapporo Games.

References

 
1972 Winter Olympics events
1972
Winter Olympics
Ski jumping competitions in Japan